Black Island, in the Ross Archipelago, is immediately west of White Island. It was first named by the Discovery Expedition (1901–04) because of its lack of snow. The island's northernmost point is named Cape Hodgson, commemorating Thomas Vere Hodgson, one of the oldest members of the Discovery Expedition.

The highest point is Mount Aurora, a principal radio relay point. Mt. Aurora was named between 1958-1959 for the Aurora, one of the ships on Shackleton's Expedition. On the minor peak of Mount Melania is the principal earth-based ground-station for the US Antarctic Program.

Black Island is volcanic in origin, consisting of a series of trachytic lava domes and basaltic pyroclastic cones. Potassium–argon dating of Black Island volcanic rocks has given ages ranging from 1.69 to 3.8 million years. There are three main geological formations representing three eruptive sequences on Black Island: Nubian Basalt Formation, Aurora Trachyte Formation, and Melania Basalt Formation. The lack of snow is not due to volcanic activity but rather the fact that it is protected from wind by nearby Minna Bluff.

See also
 List of volcanoes in Antarctica
 Composite Antarctic Gazetteer
 List of Antarctic islands south of 60° S
 Mount Nubian
 Mount Ochre
 SCAR
 Territorial claims in Antarctica
 Vella Flat

References